The purge in Norway after World War II was a purge that took place between May 1945 and August 1948 against anyone who was deemed to have collaborated with the German occupation of the country. Several thousand Norwegians and foreign citizens were tried and convicted for crimes committed in Scandinavia during the Second World War. However, the scope, legal basis, and fairness of these trials has since been a matter of some debate. A total of 40 people—including Vidkun Quisling, the Prime Minister of Norway during the occupation—were executed after capital punishment was reinstated in Norway. Thirty-seven of those executed were executed under Norwegian law, while the other three were executed under Allied military law.

Background
The German invasion of Norway during World War II created a number of constitutional issues, chiefly related to what was the legitimate Norwegian government, and whether the constitution and Norwegian code of law remained in effect during the occupation. Although the occupying power, under Reichskommissar Josef Terboven and the puppet Norwegian regime under Vidkun Quisling claimed that the Norwegian government had abandoned its authority in the spring of 1940, the Norwegian government claimed that it had merely capitulated in the military struggle for the homeland, while the executive branch had been given special powers by the Norwegian parliament through the Elverum Authorization. The Norwegian government's claim was upheld both by parliament and the Norwegian Supreme Court after the war, which in turn led to an extensive set of indictments and convictions against Norwegian citizens for treason, and German citizens for war crimes.

As early as 1941 and 1942, the Norwegian government in exile put into effect a number of decrees regarding treasonous acts. Capital punishment was reinstated as an option, prison sentences with hard labor were approved, higher upper limits for financial penalties introduced, and a controversial, new measure known as "loss of public confidence” (tap av almenn tillit) adopted, which would effectively deprive those convicted of various civil privileges. These decrees reached a final, workable form on 15 December 1944, the so-called . Crimes defined in these decrees notably included membership of Nasjonal Samling, the Norwegian fascist party that collaborated with the Nazis.

Culpable acts during the occupation
In autumn 1940 the Nazi-supporting Norwegian fascist party, Nasjonal Samling, was declared as the only legal political organization in Norway.  Its claim to be the government was based on the premise that the pre-war leadership had abdicated its responsibilities by leaving Norway. As Nasjonal Samling had taken the responsible course by assuming the mantle of power, it was therefore the legal administration. However it never achieved any level of support justifying its claim to be the legitimate Norwegian government.

This was the view taken in London by Norway's government-in-exile. It saw the Nazi Party and its Third Reich to be the "enemy of war". Anything that aided or encouraged the German occupation of Norway was to be considered in principle an act of treason; this included membership of Nasjonal Samling. Norway's exiled government also considered it to be a criminal act to assist the Nazi regime through economic support and commercial activities.

Norwegians who had volunteered for military service with the Wehrmacht, and especially Germanic-SS were subject to criminal prosecution after the war. Police officers who worked with the RSHA in the Statspolitiet (Norwegian Secret State Police) or joined the Gestapo faced charges relating to war crimes, torture, executions, and the mistreatment of prisoners.

Arrests, trials and executions
In May 1945, at the close of World War II, the paramilitary Milorg (Norway's official resistance movement in the war) joined units of the Norwegian police that had been trained in Sweden. Both had been well briefed and prepared ahead of the official liberation on 8 May 1945. The Norwegian government-in-exile assembled this force because it viewed it as paramount to avoid lynching or other extrajudicial punishment against former members of the Nazi regime. Nevertheless, during the summer of 1945, there was a fierce debate reported in Norwegian newspapers about the prosecution and punishment of war criminals and traitors. Many spoke openly of retaliation, but others argued that death penalty was a "drawback for a civilized community". As tensions hardened, those fighting against the death penalty for humanitarian reasons were stigmatized as "the silk front". Those who favored harsh penalties were known as "the ice front". The editorial pages of Norwegian newspapers (Dagbladet being one of the most prominent) demanded harsh penalties.

Within just a few days of the war ending, up to 28,750 people were arrested for questioning. Although many were released quickly, between 5,000 and 6,000 individuals were still in custody in August 1946.

Former wartime resistance leader Sven Arntzen was made acting chief barrister of the Norwegian Prosecuting Authority. He was given the responsibility for bringing the cases to trial. Arntzen played a highly public role in establishing the principles that should drive the trials. This led to considerable public and internal debate about the nature of the legal purges.

Altogether prosecutors requested death sentences in 200 cases of treason; of these only 30 were passed down, with 25 being carried out. From the beginning, the application of capital punishment was controversial in Norway, in part because the country's first government instituted capital punishment before the Norwegian parliament had reconvened after the war.

Legacy
A great deal of sensitivity continues to surround this subject in Norwegian society. In later years, studies and inquiries have shown that justice was administered unevenly and—by today's standards—harshly.

For example, the volunteers who joined the Waffen-SS and served on the Eastern Front were tried only for treason, never for war crimes. Some believe that those who sided with Nasjonal Samling were often publicly shamed and ostracised well beyond the punishment their crimes merited, such as fines or a prison sentence.
The prosecution of individuals who served with the German Red Cross has also been questioned. Among those convicted was Hanna Kvanmo, who later rose to prominence as a socialist politician.

Death sentences
All were executed by firing squad, except for Erich Hoffmann, who was hanged.

Treason

War crimes

Sentenced for war crimes by Allied law in Oslo

References

Citations

Bibliography
 University of Oslo: The Legal Purges in Norway after 1945 – A Research Project: Project Description
 Home page for project
 
 The Norwegian SS Volunteers In addition to general information about the Norwegian SS volunteers, also contains information about what happened to these soldiers after the war.
 Anika Seemann (2020) "Citizen Outcasts", Scandinavian Journal of History, 45:3, 360–383, 

Norway in World War II
Political and cultural purges
Legal history of Norway